The Big Five False Bay was an administrative area in the Umkhanyakude District of KwaZulu-Natal in South Africa.

The municipality was named after the Big Five animals (Lion, Elephant, Leopard, Cape Buffalo and Rhino) which are found in the game reserves that are located in the area e.g. the Hluhluwe game reserve, the Mfolozi game reserve and the Khinda game reserve. False Bay is part of the Greater St Lucia Wetlands Park and it forms part of the newly established municipality.

After municipal elections on 3 August 2016 it was merged into the larger Big Five Hlabisa Local Municipality.

Main places
The 2001 census divided the municipality into the following main places:

Politics 
The municipal council consisted of seven members elected by mixed-member proportional representation. Four councillors were elected by first-past-the-post voting in four wards, while the remaining three were chosen from party lists so that the total number of party representatives was proportional to the number of votes received. In the election of 18 May 2011 no party obtained a majority, and the African National Congress (ANC) and the National Freedom Party (NFP) formed a coalition to govern the municipality.
The following table shows the results of the election.

References

External links
 Official website

Former local municipalities of South Africa